Lee Dong-seop (born 4 April 1971) is a South Korean paralympic badminton player. He participated at the 2020 Summer Paralympics in the badminton competition, being awarded the bronze medal in the men's singles WH1 event. Dong-seop also participated in the men's doubles WH1–WH2 event, being awarded the silver medal with his teammate, Kim Jung-jun.

Achievements

Paralympic Games 
Men's singles

Men's doubles

World Championships
Men's singles

Men's doubles

Asian Para Games 
Men's singles

Men's doubles

Mixed doubles

Asian Championships 
Men's singles

Men's doubles

Mixed doubles

International Tournaments (12 titles, 4 runners-up) 
Men's singles

Men's doubles

Mixed doubles

References 

Living people
Place of birth missing (living people)
South Korean male badminton players
Paralympic bronze medalists for South Korea
Paralympic silver medalists for South Korea
Paralympic medalists in badminton
Badminton players at the 2020 Summer Paralympics
Medalists at the 2020 Summer Paralympics
1971 births